Donjon (French for "keep") is an independently published role-playing game by Clinton R. Nixon, published by Anvilwerks.

History
Donjon, a narrative dungeon crawl game by Zak Arntson and Clinton R. Nixon, was one of the indie role-playing games that appeared in the months following the casual group of enthusiasts gathered at the booth for Adept Press at GenCon 34 in 2002, which unofficially became a booth for The Forge. Donjon, InSpectres, and Misguided Games' Children of the Sun (2002) were finalists for the initial Indie Game of the Year award, but they lost to Dust Devils (2002) by Matt Snyder.

Description
Donjon is a fantasy game that is both a parody of and an homage to Dungeons & Dragons. Based on the result of die rolls in conflict resolution, players get to add facts to the situation, which gives them power to steer the adventure in directions the game master does not expect.

References

Fantasy role-playing games
Indie role-playing games
Role-playing games introduced in 2002